Fereydoun Jeyrani (born in 1951, Kashmar) is an Iranian film director, screenwriter, and television presenter. He was the director, producer and host of the first series of Haft (Seven), an Iranian television series about Iranian cinema, until 2012. Along with his unconventional performance in Haft, he is best known for directing Red, The Season Salad, Water and Fire, Pink and I Am a Mother.

Filmography

References

External links

1951 births
Living people
Iranian film directors
Iranian screenwriters
Iranian television presenters
People from Kashmar